Simeon Roksandić (14 May 1874 – 12 January 1943) was a Serbian sculptor and academic, famous for his bronzes and fountains. He is frequently cited as one of the most renowned figures in Serbian and Yugoslavian sculpture.

Roksandić exhibited his artworks as a part of Kingdom of Serbia's pavilion at International Exhibition of Art of 1911.

He sculptured the "Unfortunate Fisherman" fountains in Kalemegdan Park in Belgrade, Serbia and in Jezuitski Square, Zagreb, Croatia.

Gallery

See also
 Petar Ubavkić
 Đorđe Jovanović
 Risto Stijović
 Sreten Stojanović

References

External links
S. Roksandić - one of several notable people who lived and worked in Glina
Sculpture - "The Boy Who Walked His Feet Off"
Roksandic Fountain

Croatian sculptors
Serbian sculptors
Male sculptors
1874 births
1943 deaths
20th-century sculptors
People from Glina, Croatia